The second season of The Fosters premiered on June 16, 2014 and ended on March 23, 2015. The season consisted of 21 episodes and stars Teri Polo and Sherri Saum as Stef Foster and Lena Adams, an interracial lesbian couple, who foster a girl (Maia Mitchell) and her younger brother (Hayden Byerly) while also trying to juggle raising Latino twin teenagers (Cierra Ramirez and Jake T. Austin) and Stef's biological son (David Lambert).

Premise 
In this season, some will face the consequences of their past mistakes while others will fight fiercely to ensure a more promising future for their growing family. Stef and Lena find themselves on the defense when Robert Quinn expresses a sincere interest in having Callie be part of his family. A startling development leaves Callie in a tailspin, resulting in questionable decisions about her future, while Jude tries to manage his friendship with Connor amid their parents' conflict

Cast

Main cast
 Teri Polo as Stef Adams Foster
 Sherri Saum as Lena Adams Foster
 Maia Mitchell as Callie Jacob
 Jake T. Austin as Jesus Adams Foster
 Cierra Ramirez as Mariana Adams Foster
 David Lambert as Brandon Adams Foster
 Hayden Byerly as Jude Adams Foster
 Danny Nucci as Mike Foster

Recurring cast
 Jordan Rodrigues as Mat Tan
 Ashley Argota as Lou Chan
 Caitlin Carver as Hayley Heinz
 Kerr Smith as Robert Quinn
 Bailee Madison as Sophia Quinn
 Valerie Dillman as Jill Quinn
 Alexandra Barreto as Ana Gutierrez
 Gavin MacIntosh as Connor Stevens
 Amanda Leighton as Emma
 Daffany Clark as Daphne Keene
 Annika Marks as Monte Porter
 Alex Saxon as Wyatt
 Samantha Logan as Tia Stephens
 Madison Pettis as Daria 
 Izabela Vidovic as Taylor
 Hannah Kasulka as Kaitlyn
 Brandon W. Jones as Liam Olmstead
 Alberto De Diego as Rafael
 Tom Phelan as Cole
 Cherinda Kincherlow as Kiara
 Rosie O'Donnell as Rita Hendricks

Guest cast
 Annie Potts as Sharon Elkin
 Lorraine Toussaint as Dana Adams
 Marlene Forte as Elena Gutierrez
 Tony Plana as Victor Gutierrez
 Jamie McShane as Donald Jacob
 Annamarie Kenoyer as Becka
 Alicia Sixtos as Carmen
 Marla Sokoloff as Dani Kirkland

Episodes

Production

Casting
In March 2015, it was announced that Jake T. Austin would be leaving the show. He tweeted: "I'm honored to have been a part of such a groundbreaking series, but I personally want to let you know that my time on the show has come to an end. Thank you for letting me be a part of your family, it's been a pleasure." It was announced in June 2015, Noah Centineo would replace Austin in the role of Jesus.

References

2014 American television seasons
2015 American television seasons
The Fosters (American TV series)